Torsten Nielsen (born 5 March 1967) is a Danish politician and mayor of Viborg Municipality for the Conservative People's Party. Nielsen is state authorized Estate agent since 1992, and he was elected to the City Council of Viborg Municipality in 2009, and re-elected in 2013. Nielsen succeeded the former mayor, Søren Pape Poulsen, when he was appointed as the new leader of the Conservative People's Party.

References

1967 births
Living people
Conservative People's Party (Denmark) politicians
People from Viborg Municipality